Ingvar Ericsson may refer to
Ingvar Ericsson (cyclist) (1914–1995), Swedish cyclist
Ingvar Ericsson (runner) (1927–2020), Swedish middle-distance runner